The Ahmedabad–Lucknow Weekly Express is an Superfast Express train belonging to Western Railway zone that runs between  and  in India. It is currently being operated with 19401/19402 train numbers on a weekly basis.

Service

The 19401/Ahmedabad–Lucknow Express has an average speed of 48 km/hr and covers 1301 km in 26h 50m. 19402/Lucknow–Ahmedabad Weekly Express has an average speed of 47 km/hr and covers 1301 km in 27h 55m.

Schedule

Route and halts 

The important halts of the train are :

Coach composition

The train has standard LHB rakes with max speed of 110 kmph. The train consists of 18 coaches:

 1 AC II Tier
 2 AC III Tier
 6 Sleeper coaches
 5 General Unreserved
 2 Seating cum Luggage Rake

Traction

Both trains are hauled by a Vadodara Loco Shed-based WAP-7 electric locomotive from Ahmedabad to Lucknow and vice versa.

Rake sharing 

The train shares its rake with 19407/19408 Ahmedabad–Varanasi Weekly Express.

Direction reversal

Train reverses its direction 1 times:

See also 

 Ahmedabad Junction railway station
 Lucknow Charbagh railway station
 Ahmedabad–Patna Weekly Express
 Dwarka Express
 Sabarmati Express

References

Notes

External links 

 19401/Ahmedabad–Lucknow Weekly Express India Rail Info
 19402/Lucknow–Ahmedabad Weekly Express India Rail Info

Rail transport in Gujarat
Rail transport in Haryana
Rail transport in Delhi
Rail transport in Bihar
Transport in Ahmedabad
Passenger trains originating from Lucknow
Express trains in India
Railway services introduced in 2014